First Crater is a volcanic crater on Arrival Heights, located  north of Hut Point on Ross Island. It was named by Frank Debenham in 1912 on his local survey of Hut Point Peninsula during the British Antarctic Expedition, 1910–13.

References 

Volcanoes of Ross Island
Volcanic craters